In electromagnetism, Jefimenko's equations (named after Oleg D. Jefimenko) give the electric field and magnetic field due to a distribution of electric charges and electric current in space, that takes into account the propagation delay (retarded time) of the fields due to the finite speed of light and relativistic effects.  Therefore they can be used for moving charges and currents.  They are the particular solutions to Maxwell's equations for any arbitrary distribution of charges and currents.

Equations

Electric and magnetic fields

Jefimenko's equations give the electric field E and magnetic field B produced by an arbitrary charge or current distribution, of charge density ρ and current density J:

where r′ is a point in the charge distribution, r is a point in space, and

is the retarded time. There are similar expressions for D and H.

These equations are the time-dependent generalization of Coulomb's law and the Biot–Savart law to electrodynamics, which were originally true only for electrostatic and magnetostatic fields, and steady currents.

Origin from retarded potentials

Jefimenko's equations can be found from the retarded potentials φ and A:

which are the solutions to Maxwell's equations in the potential formulation, then substituting in the definitions of the electromagnetic potentials themselves:

and using the relation

replaces the potentials φ and A by the fields E and B.

Heaviside–Feynman formula

The Heaviside–Feynman formula, also known as the Jefimenko–Feynman formula, can be seen as the point-like electric charge version of Jefimenko's equations. Actually, it can be (non trivially) deduced from them using Dirac functions, or using the Liénard-Wiechert potentials. It is mostly known from The Feynman Lectures on Physics, where it was used to introduce and describe the origin of electromagnetic radiation. The formula provides a natural generalization of the Coulomb's law for cases where the source charge is moving:

Since the electromagnetic field propagates at the speed of light, both these quantities are evaluated at the retarded time .

The first term in the formula for  represents the Coulomb's law for the static electric field. Heuristically, this can be regarded as nature "attempting" to forecast what the present field would be by linear extrapolation to the present time. The last term, proportional to the second derivative of the unit direction vector , is sensitive to charge motion perpendicular to the line of sight.

The Heaviside–Feynman formula can be derived from Maxwell's equations using the technique of the retarded potential. It allows, for example, the derivation of the Larmor formula for overall radiation power of the accelerating charge.

Discussion
There is a widespread interpretation of Maxwell's equations indicating that spatially varying electric and magnetic fields can cause each other to change in time, thus giving rise to a propagating electromagnetic wave (electromagnetism). However, Jefimenko's equations show an alternative point of view. Jefimenko says, "...neither Maxwell's equations nor their solutions indicate an existence of causal links between electric and magnetic fields. Therefore, we must conclude that an electromagnetic field is a dual entity always having an electric and a magnetic component simultaneously created by their common sources: time-variable electric charges and currents."

As pointed out by McDonald, Jefimenko's equations seem to appear first in 1962 in the second edition of Panofsky and Phillips's classic textbook. David Griffiths, however, clarifies that "the earliest explicit statement of which I am aware was by Oleg Jefimenko, in 1966" and characterizes equations in Panofsky and Phillips's  textbook as only "closely related expressions". According to Andrew Zangwill, the equations analogous to Jefimenko's but in the Fourier frequency domain were first derived by George Adolphus Schott in his treatise Electromagnetic Radiation (University Press, Cambridge, 1912).

Essential features of these equations are easily observed which is that the right hand sides involve "retarded" time which reflects the "causality" of the expressions. In other words, the left side of each equation is actually "caused" by the right side, unlike the normal differential expressions for Maxwell's equations where both sides take place simultaneously. In the typical expressions for Maxwell's equations there is no doubt that both sides are equal to each other, but as Jefimenko notes, "... since each of these equations connects quantities simultaneous in time, none of these equations can represent a causal relation."

See also
 Liénard–Wiechert potential

Notes

Electrodynamics
Electromagnetism